Urodeta cuspidis is a moth of the family Elachistidae. It is found in Cameroon.

The wingspan is 5.6-6.1 mm. The thorax, tegula and forewing are strongly mottled with scales which are white basally and brown distally. The hindwings are brownish grey. Adults have been recorded in early May.

Etymology
The species name is derived from the Latin cuspidis (meaning pointed end) and refers to the pointed apex of phallus.

References

Endemic fauna of Cameroon
Elachistidae
Moths described in 2011
Insects of Cameroon
Moths of Africa